Leslie Norman "Les" Roebuck (10 November 1885 – 18 May 1973) was an Australian rules footballer who played with Geelong in the Victorian Football League (VFL). He was also a leading tennis player.

VFL
Roebuck is on record as weighing only 57 kg, during his football career at Geelong, where he played for four seasons.

Recruited from Geelong West, Roebuck was Geelong's leading goalkicker in the 1906 VFL season, with 21 goals. His best goal tally in a game was five, which he got against Melbourne at Corio Oval in 1907.

Tennis
Roebuck played regularly on the tennis circuit and competed at the 1914 Australasian Championships. In the opening round he defeated W. C. Marsden, then conceded a second round walkover to two-time former champion Rodney Heath, who went on to make the semi finals.

References

External links

1885 births
Australian rules footballers from Geelong
Geelong Football Club players
Geelong West Football Club players
Australian male tennis players
Tennis people from Victoria (Australia)
1973 deaths
People educated at Geelong College